Giorgi Tenadze (born 24 May 1962 in Gori) is a Georgian judoka who competed for the Soviet Union in the 1988 Summer Olympics.

In 1988 he won the bronze medal in the lightweight class.

He is bronze medalist winner for the Soviet team in 1988, bronze medalist European Championship in Belgrade in 1989

External links
 
 Profile at Sports-Reference.com

1962 births
Living people
Male judoka from Georgia (country)
Soviet male judoka
Olympic judoka of the Soviet Union
Judoka at the 1988 Summer Olympics
Olympic bronze medalists for the Soviet Union
Olympic medalists in judo
Medalists at the 1988 Summer Olympics
Universiade medalists in judo
People from Poti
Universiade bronze medalists for the Soviet Union